Gary John Crocker (born 16 May 1962) is a former Zimbabwean cricketer who played in three Test matches and six One Day Internationals in 1992 and 1993. He is a past student of Hamilton High School.

Born in Bulawayo, Crocker played in Zimbabwe's first ever Test match, at Harare in 1992. Crocker retired from international cricket in 1993, and due to the political instability and economic meltdown in Zimbabwe he immigrated to the United States. Crocker resides in Los Angeles and plays social cricket for the Hollywood Cricket Club. His son Sean is a professional golfer.

References

External links

1962 births
Cricketers from Bulawayo
Zimbabwean people of British descent
Living people
Zimbabwe Test cricketers
Zimbabwe One Day International cricketers
Zimbabwean cricketers
White Zimbabwean sportspeople
Zimbabwean emigrants to the United States